The men's 5000 metres race of the 2013–14 ISU Speed Skating World Cup 1, arranged in the Olympic Oval, in Calgary, Alberta, Canada, was held on 10 November 2013.

Sven Kramer of the Netherlands won, followed by fellow Dutchman Jorrit Bergsma in second place, and Lee Seung-hoon of South Korea in third place. Jonathan Kuck of the United States won Division B.

Results
The race took place on Sunday, 10 November, with Division A scheduled in the morning session, at 12:20, and Division B scheduled in the afternoon session, at 17:25.

Division A

Division B

References

Men 5000
1